Anatoly Iosifovich Lavrentiev (Russian:Анатолий Иосифович Лаврентьев; 1904 – 1984) was a Soviet diplomat. He served as the head of the People's Commissariat for Foreign Affairs of the Russian SFSR in the Soviet government from 8 March 1944 to 13 March 1946. He was a member of the CPSU (b).

Biography 
Lavrentiev graduated from the Moscow Power Engineering Institute in 1931 and became a teacher at the Institute.

From 1938 to 1939, he worked as an employee of the apparatus of the People's Commissariat of Heavy Industry of the USSR. In 1939 he was the head of the Eastern European department of the USSR People's Commissariat of Foreign Affairs.

From 1939 to 1940 he was the ambassador of the USSR in Bulgaria. From 1940 to 1941 years he served as Plenipotentiary representative of the USSR in Romania and from 1941 he served as the Extraordinary and Plenipotentiary Envoy of the USSR in Romania.

From 1941 to 1943, he served as a responsible officer of the TASS.

In 1943 he served as the Head of the European Department of the USSR People's Commissariat of Foreign Affairs. From 1943 to 1944 he served as Head of the Middle East Department of the USSR People's Commissariat of Foreign Affairs.

From 1944 to 1946 he served as People's Commissar for Foreign Affairs of the Russian SFSR. From 1946 to 1949 he served as Extraordinary and Plenipotentiary Ambassador of the USSR in Yugoslavia.

From 1949 to 1951 he served as Deputy Minister of Foreign Affairs of the USSR.

From 1951 to 1952 he served as Extraordinary and Plenipotentiary Ambassador of the USSR in Czechoslovakia. According to the CIA report, Lavrentiev was "one of the Kremlin's most ruthless and competent foreign affairs officials." From 1952 to 1953 he served as Extraordinary and Plenipotentiary Ambassador of the USSR in Romania.
 
From 1953 to 1956 he served as Extraordinary and Plenipotentiary Ambassador of the USSR in Iran. He met Iran's prime minister, Mohammad Mosaddeq in 1953 and brought forth the Soviet agenda in Iran. After the fall of Mosaddeq in the 1953 Iranian coup d'état, he tried to commit suicide. He was briefly withdrawn but again reinstalled and returned to his post in Iran.
From 1956 to 1970 years he served as an employee of the central apparatus of the USSR Ministry of Foreign Affairs.

References  

Ambassadors of the Soviet Union to Bulgaria
Ambassadors of the Soviet Union to Romania
Ambassadors of the Soviet Union to Yugoslavia
Ambassadors of the Soviet Union to Czechoslovakia
Ambassadors of the Soviet Union to Iran
1904 births
1984 deaths